The Melbourne Stars are an Australian cricket club who play in the Big Bash League, the national domestic Twenty20 competition. The club was established in 2011 as an inaugural member of the eight-club league. The Big Bash League consists of a regular season and a finals series of the top four teams. This list includes players who have played at least one match for the Stars in the Big Bash League.

List of players
Players are listed according to the date of their debut for the Heat. All statistics are for Big Bash League and Champions League Twenty20 only.
 The number to the left of player name represents 'cap'. For players who debuted for club in the same match, player caps are ordered by that of the batting order.
 Hover over column headings for key
 Currently contracted players names are in bold

See also
 Melbourne Stars
 Big Bash League

References

Lists of Australian cricketers
Big Bash League lists
Melbourne sport-related lists